Kim Gwang-ho (born 7 August 1973) is a North Korean figure skater. He competed in the pairs event at the 1992 Winter Olympics.

References

1973 births
Living people
North Korean male pair skaters
Olympic figure skaters of North Korea
Figure skaters at the 1992 Winter Olympics
Place of birth missing (living people)